Börje Wickberg (27 February 1926 – 3 March 2013) was a Swedish chemist.

Wickberg graduated with a Ph.D. in 1960 from the Royal Institute of Technology with a thesis on carbohydrate chemistry, and was simultaneously awarded the title as Docent. In 1960–61, he was a research associate at lowa State University, USA, and in 1961–62 at Indiana University, USA. During part of this time, he worked with natural products' chemist Ernest Wenkert. In 1966 he was appointed Professor of organic chemistry at Lund University where he stayed until his retirement in 1991. He was elected to the Royal Physiographic Society in Lund in 1967, and to the Royal Swedish Academy of Sciences in 1984.

Sources 
 Sterner, Olov; ”Forskade om svampars kemi”, Sydsvenska Dagbladet Snällposten, Malmö, March 27, 2013 (in swe)
Vem är det : Svensk biografisk handbok 1969, Sten Lagerström (Ed.), P. A. Norstedt & Söners Förlag, Stockholm 1968. p. 1024

References 

1926 births
2013 deaths
Swedish chemists
Academic staff of Lund University
Members of the Royal Physiographic Society in Lund
Members of the Royal Swedish Academy of Sciences